The following is a list of Cincinnati Bearcats men's basketball head coaches. There have been 28 head coaches of the Bearcats in their 121-season history.

Cincinnati's current head coach is Wes Miller. He was hired as the Bearcats' head coach in April 2021, replacing John Brannen, who was fired after the 2020–21 season.

References

Cincinnati

Cincinnati Bearcats men's basketball coaches